Finlyandsky (masculine), Finlyandskaya (feminine), or Finlyandskoye (neuter) may refer to:
Finlyandsky Municipal Okrug, a municipal okrug of Kalininsky District of the federal city of St. Petersburg, Russia
Finland Station (Finlyandsky vokzal), a rail terminal in St. Petersburg, Russia